Okeem Challenger (born 22 August 1989) is an Antiguan and Barbudan footballer who plays for SAP in the Antigua and Barbuda Premier Division.

International career
Nicknamed Soda, Challenger made his debut for Antigua and Barbuda in a March 2008 FIFA World Cup qualification match against Aruba, in which game he came on as a late substitute for Randolph Burton and immediately scored the winner. He has earned five caps since, but only played in one World Cup qualification game.

International goals
Scores and results list Antigua and Barbuda's goal tally first.

References

External links

Living people
Antigua and Barbuda footballers
Antigua and Barbuda international footballers
Association football forwards
SAP F.C. players
1989 births
Antigua and Barbuda under-20 international footballers
Antigua and Barbuda youth international footballers